Le donne letterate, composed by Antonio Salieri, is an Italian opera in three acts. Stylistically it is an opera buffa and is very similar to the mid-18th century librettos of Carlo Goldoni.

This opera was the first of Salieri's to be publicly performed, as well as his first collaboration with Boccherini. This was Salieri's second complete opera.

Performance history
Salieri, wrote Le donne letterate in Vienna in late 1769 and early 1770. It received its first performance during Carnival that same year at one of the Imperial theaters in Vienna. There is some dispute among scholars as to the date and place of the premiere. Rudolph Angermüller lists 10 January 1770 in the Burgtheater as the first performance. The opera was apparently revived only once, in Prague in 1773. There is no known modern performance history.

Roles

Recordings

There is no known studio recording of the complete opera, or excerpts.

See also

Notes

References
 Rudolph Angermüller, Antonio Salieri 3 Vol. (Munich 1971–74)
 Volkmar Braunbehrens, Maligned Master – the Real Story of Antonio Salieri, transl. Eveline L. Kanes (New York 1992)
 V. Della Croce/F. Blanchetti, Il caso Salieri (Torino 1994)
 , Über das Leben und die Werke des Anton Salieri (Vienna 1827) (reprinted 1999, edited with notes by Rudolph Angermüller)
 John A. Rice, Antonio Salieri and Viennese Opera (Chicago 1998),  
 Alexander Wheelock Thayer, Salieri: Rival of Mozart (Kansas City 1989)

External links
 Article on the Roman Intermezzo by John Rice, 2008

Operas by Antonio Salieri
Italian-language operas
1770 operas
Operas
Operas based on plays
Operas based on works by Molière